Ikogosi: The Last Turn on Left is a 2015 Nigerian romantic drama film, produced and directed by Toka McBaror. It stars Chelsea Eze, IK Ogbonna, Lisa Omoriodon, Leo Orji, Didi Ekanem. The film narrates "the story of a simple holiday which goes bad and turns into an ugly trip".

The film was generally panned by film critics.

Cast
Chelsea Eze as Emem
IK Ogbonna as
Lisa Omoriodon as Emilia
Leo Orji as
Didi Ekanem as
Rachel Emem Isaac as
Bruttus Richard as
Toka McBaror as

Reception
Ikogosi was panned by critics. Ada of Nollywood Reinvented gives the film 2 out of 5 stars, praising the set design, music and costumes, but criticizes the story and screenplay, the actors' performances, and directing. She concludes: "Though there are enough stories about relationships and marriage that definitely need to be told, they have been done so many times. There's a need to make movies around such topics that add more dimension and tell the stories in different and unexpected ways. There were enough dimensions to the plot of Ikogosi to develop and the resolutions definitely deserved more set up. I would not advise committing time to watching this movie unless you are bored. Completely bored". Adenike Adebayo heavily criticized the purpose of the film and rated it 1 out of 5 stars.

References

External links

2015 romantic drama films
Nigerian romantic drama films
Films shot in Ekiti
English-language Nigerian films
2010s English-language films